Vikram Vasantrao Kale is an Indian politician who is current member of Maharashtra Legislative Council.

Personal life 
Kale was born in Palsap village in Osmanabad district present day Maharashtra. After completing his school education, he went to Dr. B.R. Ambedkar Marathwada university to study education.

He married Shubhangi in 1999 and has two daughters Nishigandha and Sanjana. He has one brother Anil and two sisters Usha and Kranti.

Political career 
He was member of Maharashtra Legislative Council from 6 January 2010 to 5 December 2016.

Again he was elected for second term on 8 February 2017 from Auranagabad teachers constituency.

References 
Candidate information 8 February 2017.
Data on election commission. 7 February 2017

Living people
1978 births
People from Osmanabad
Marathi politicians
Nationalist Congress Party politicians
People from Marathwada
Members of the Maharashtra Legislative Council
Nationalist Congress Party politicians from Maharashtra